The Brahmanical Magazine was an English language magazine set up by Indian reformer Raja Rammohan Roy. It was first published in 1821. It attempted to avoid the effects of  the missionaries’ propaganda. During its existence the magazine produced a total of twelve issues.

References

 

Defunct magazines published in India
Defunct political magazines
English-language magazines published in India
Magazines established in 1821
Magazines with year of disestablishment missing
Political magazines published in India